Islamic Revolution Committees or Committees of Islamic Revolution, simply known as the Committee, was a law enforcement force in Iran acting under Ministry of Interior. The Committee was responsible for enforcing Islamic regulations and moral standards on social behavior. Founded as one of Organizations of the Iranian Revolution in 1979, it was eventually merged with Shahrbani and Gendarmerie to form Law Enforcement Command of Islamic Republic of Iran (FARAJA) in 1991.

References 

 
Organizations established in 1979
1979 establishments in Iran
Islamic religious police
Defunct law enforcement agencies
Revolutionary institutions of the Islamic Republic of Iran
Sharia in Iran